Clanis thailandica is a species of moth of the  family Sphingidae. It is known from Thailand.

References

Clanis
Moths described in 2004